Thai Philatelic Museum is a postal museum in Phaya Thai District in Bangkok, Thailand.

It was renovated and moved to the building behind the Samsen Nai post office at Saphan Khwai in December 2004. Among its exhibits are the awards Thai philatelists received from various international competitions together with photocopies of the winning entries, posters depicting rare Thai stamps, and winning postage stamp designs.

External links
 

Museums in Bangkok
Philatelic museums
Philately of Thailand
Phaya Thai district